The 1st Armored Regiment was a regiment in the Lebanese Armed Forces. It was established in 2005. Its mission was to fight Israeli troops, fight smugglers, support other security forces, and increase the stability of the nation, among other tasks.

References

Lebanese military personnel